"Smoke & Retribution" is a song by Australian DJ and record producer Flume. It features vocals from American rapper Vince Staples and Australian singer Kučka. It made its debut on Zane Lowe's Beats 1 radio show and was released on 29 January 2016, by Future Classic. The track is taken from Flume's second studio album, Skin.

Background
Flume explained that he had started work on this song in the back of a van on the way to Las Vegas in mid-2015. Flume said, "It wasn't originally intended to have rap on it. Vince and I got to meet in person for the first time in L.A. in September, and that's when I showed him the beat... a few weeks later he sent back new verses for it. I was really happy, I love the tone of his voice... Similar story with Kučka's involvement in the track... she's got a lot of talent and I'm hoping to work a lot more with her in the future."

Critical reception
In a positive review, Ryan Middleton of Music Times said "In 'Smoke & Retribution' Flume continues to show growth away from his oft-copied Australian synth-heavy sound for a track that is more conducive to a rapper, but also remains familiar to what Flume fans know the Australia producer for. He adds in quirky 8-bit synths, video game sounds and a jerky beat that molds to the sensibilities of Staples and Kučka." Eric Torres of Pitchfork described the track as a "thrilling makeover" of electro music.

Consequence of Sound said "Here, synths flicker and flare as guest collaborators Vince Staples and Kučka unfurl lines both swaggering and hypnotic."

Charts

Certifications

References

2016 singles
2016 songs
Flume (musician) songs
Future Classic singles
Kučka songs
Song recordings produced by Flume (musician)
Songs written by Flume (musician)
Songs written by Kučka
Songs written by Vince Staples
Vince Staples songs